Oliver Jesse Carter (April 7, 1911 – June 14, 1976) was a United States district judge of the United States District Court for the Northern District of California.

Education and career

The son of future California Supreme Court Justice Jesse W. Carter, Carter was born in San Francisco, California where his father was attending the Golden Gate University School of Law. Carter received a Bachelor of Laws from the University of California, Hastings College of the Law in 1935. He was in private practice in Redding, California from 1936 to 1938. He was an assistant district attorney of Shasta County, California from 1938 to 1939. He returned to private practice in Redding from 1940 to 1950, and served in the California State Senate from 1941 to 1949.

Federal judicial service

On September 27, 1950, Carter received a recess appointment from President Harry S. Truman to a new seat on the United States District Court for the Northern District of California created by 63 Stat. 493. Formally nominated to the same seat by President Truman on November 27, 1950, he was confirmed by the United States Senate on December 13, 1950, and received his commission on December 21, 1950. He served as Chief Judge from 1970 to 1976, assuming senior status on April 7, 1976. Carter served in that capacity until his death on June 14, 1976, of a heart attack.

Notable case

Carter presided over the eight-week trial of Patty Hearst, including the jury's return of a guilty verdict on March 20, 1976.  Following the trial, Carter died unexpectedly prior to the resolution of Hearst's sentencing, which ultimately took place on September 24, 1976.

References

Sources

External links 
 Guide to the Oliver J. Carter Collection, 1951-1976. Collection Guide, California State Library, California History Room.
 Join California Oliver J. Carter

1911 births
1976 deaths
University of California, Hastings College of the Law alumni
Democratic Party California state senators
Judges of the United States District Court for the Northern District of California
United States district court judges appointed by Harry S. Truman
20th-century American judges
Lawyers from San Francisco
People from Redding, California
20th-century American politicians